Belfast City Hall (Ulster-Scots: Bilfawst Citie Haw) is the civic building of Belfast City Council located in Donegall Square, Belfast, Northern Ireland. It faces North and effectively divides the commercial and business areas of the city centre. It is a Grade A listed building.

History

Belfast City Hall was commissioned to replace the Old Town Hall in Victoria Street. The catalyst for change came in 1888 when Belfast was awarded city status by Queen Victoria. This was in recognition of Belfast's rapid expansion and thriving linen, rope-making, shipbuilding and engineering industries. During this period Belfast briefly overtook Dublin as the most populous city in Ireland.

It was in this context that in the late 19th century the new city leaders formed the view that the Victoria Street building was not imposing enough and decided to commission a new building: the site they selected was once the home of the White Linen Hall, an important international Linen Exchange. The street that runs from the back door of Belfast City Hall through the middle of Linen Quarter is Linen Hall Street.

Belfast Corporation used their profits from the gas industry to pay for the construction of the Belfast City Hall. The building, which was designed by Sir Alfred Brumwell Thomas in the Baroque Revival style, was built in Portland Stone at a cost of £369,000 and opened on 1 August 1906. Local firms H&J Martin and WH Stephens were among the companies involved in the design and construction. James G. Gamble, principal city architect with Belfast Corporation, was clerk of works for the erection of the City Hall circa 1896-1906. 

The city hall in Durban, South Africa is almost an exact replica of Belfast's City Hall. It was built in 1910 and designed by Stanley G. Hudson, who was inspired by the Belfast design. The Port of Liverpool Building, designed by Sir Arnold Thornely and completed in 1913, is another very close relative.

On 1 August 2006 the City Hall celebrated its centenary with a "Century of Memories" exhibition and family picnic day. On 3 December 2012, the City Council voted to limit the days that the Union Flag flies from City Hall to no more than 18 designated days. Since 1906, the flag had been flown every day of the year. The move was backed by the Council's Irish nationalist Councillors and by its Alliance Party Councillors. It was opposed by the unionist Councillors, who had enjoyed a majority on the council until the Northern Ireland local elections of 2011. On the night of the vote, unionist and loyalist protesters tried to storm the City Hall. They held protests throughout Northern Ireland, some of which became violent.

Exterior

The hall features towers at each of the four corners, with a lantern-crowned  green copper dome in the centre. The pediment sculpture is by F. W. Pomeroy, assisted by local carver J. Edgar Winter, and features on the reverse side of the current series of £10, £20, £50 and £100 sterling banknotes issued by the Northern Bank.

Interior
The interior has a number of notable features including the Porte-Cochère and Grand Entrance, the Grand Staircase, the Reception Room and the Banqueting Hall. The roof above the Banqueting Hall was destroyed during the Belfast blitz on the night of 4/5 May 1941 and had to be rebuilt.

Carrara, Pavonazzo and Brescia marbles are used extensively throughout the building as are stained glass windows featuring among others the Belfast Coat of Arms, portraits of Queen Victoria and William III and shields of the Provinces of Ireland. There is also a stained glass window commemorating the 36th (Ulster) Division.

Grounds and public memorials
The memorial to Sir Edward Harland, the former head of the Harland and Wolff shipyard and Lord Mayor of Belfast, was sculpted by Sir Thomas Brock and unveiled by the Earl of Glasgow on 23 June 1903. The statue of Queen Victoria also by Brock was unveiled by King Edward VII on 27 July 1903. The Titanic Memorial in Belfast was dedicated in June 1920.

The grounds also house Northern Ireland's main war memorial, the Garden of Remembrance and Cenotaph, unveiled in 1929. There is also a granite column dedicated to the American Expeditionary Force, many of whom were based in Belfast prior to D-Day, unveiled in 1943.

A  memorial to Leading Seaman James Magennis VC, made from Portland stone and bronze, was erected in the grounds in October 1999.

On 3 January 2006 Belfast City Councillors ratified a plan to erect a statue to the late Belfast footballer George Best in the grounds of the City Hall. Following approval from the Best family, the George Best Memorial Trust was created in December 2006. The trust's patron David Healy contributed £1,000 to the estimated total cost of £200,000.

The wheel had 42 air-conditioned capsules, which could hold up to six adults and two children. The wheel finally closed at 6:00 pm on 11 April 2010 and was removed during May 2010.

In 2008, the Imjin River Memorial was relocated here when the St Patrick's Barracks in Ballymena closed. The memorial commemorates Irish troops lost in the Battle of Chaegunghyon (Battle of Happy Valley) in January 1951 during the Korean War.

See also
List of public art in Belfast

References

External links
Belfast City Hall

Buildings and structures in Belfast
Parks in Belfast
City and town halls in Northern Ireland
Government buildings in Northern Ireland
Edwardian architecture
Grade A listed buildings
Tourist attractions in Belfast
Limestone buildings in the United Kingdom
Government buildings with domes